John Joseph Barry (born 6 December 1966) is an Irish academic, green political economist and former Green Party politician. He was a councillor on Ards and North Down Borough Council from May 2014 to March 2018.

He is a former co-chair of the party, having held the position from 2003 until standing down in April 2009.

Personal life 
Barry studied at University College Dublin. He moved to work as a lecturer at Keele University while undertaking postgraduate study at the University of Glasgow.

In 2000, he moved to work at Queen's University Belfast.

Barry was acting director of the Institute of Governance, Public Policy and Social Research at Queen's University Belfast and is currently Reader in Politics in the School of Politics, International Studies and Philosophy and assistant director of the Institute for a Sustainable World.

From January 2007 to June 2007, Barry was the "Benedict Distinguished Visiting Professor of Political Science" at Carleton College in Northfield, Minnesota.

He has written many books and academic articles on sustainable development, environmental policy and the economics of sustainability.  He is co-editor of two academic journals, Environmental Politics and Ecopolitics Online.

Political career 
Barry's political life began in the Workers' Party and then Democratic Left.

By January 2003, he was elected as joint leader of the Green Party in Northern Ireland, alongside Kelly Andrews. He stood unsuccessfully in North Down at the 2003 Assembly election. He also stood in the Holywood ward for the local elections in 2005 and narrowly missed being elected by 60 votes.

He was a prime mover behind the creation of an all-island Green Party, officially launched in December 2006 in advance of the 2007 NI Assembly elections, which saw the Greens get their first Assembly seat in North Down with Brian Wilson.

References

External links
Green Economics: Dr John Barry
Curriculum Vitae for Dr. John Barry

Living people
Green Party in Northern Ireland politicians
Alumni of the University of Glasgow
Academics of Keele University
Academics of Queen's University Belfast
Leaders of political parties in Northern Ireland
1966 births